Siege of Gerona may refer to:

Battle of Gerona (1808) in the Peninsular War
Second siege of Gerona (1808) in the Peninsular War
Third siege of Gerona (1809) in the Peninsular War